The Harvard Graduate Students Union (HGSU), officially known as Harvard Graduate Students Union United Auto Workers (HGSU-UAW), is a labor union representing graduate students, teaching assistants, and other student employees at Harvard University. The bargaining unit comprises about 5,000 student employees, including graduate students working as research assistants and teaching fellows as well as several hundred undergraduate students holding teaching positions. Contract negotiations with the university are scheduled to begin in Fall 2018. HGSU is affiliated with the United Auto Workers labor union, whose 400,000 members include 45,000 graduate students and 30,000 academic workers.

History
A group of graduate students began a union organizing campaign in Spring 2015. By February 2016, union organizers calling themselves the Harvard Graduate Student Union-United Auto Workers claimed to have collected election authorization cards from over 60% of graduate students. In August 2016, the National Labor Relations Board (NLRB) overturned previous precedent since 2004 that graduate students at private universities were not employees with collective bargaining rights. Following this decision, HGSU organizers petitioned for a union representation election to be held.

In October 2016, union organizers and the university announced that a two-day, secret ballot election on union representation would take place on November 16–17 of that year. In the 2016 election, 1,274 voters cast ballots favoring unionization and 1,456 opposed unionization,  with 314 ballots challenged on eligibility grounds. The NLRB ultimately overturned the results of that election and ordered a new election, finding that the university failed to furnish an accurate list of eligible voters. The second election was held in April 2018. On April 20, the NLRB announced the results of the two day election, reporting 1,931 votes (56%) in favor to 1,523 opposed. In the second election, 70% of eligible voters cast a ballot. In May 2018, Harvard University announced that it would recognize the union and enter into contract negotiations in good faith.

The union and university administrators held their first bargaining session in October 2018. On May 1, 2019, about 30 union members held a sit-in and others marched in support of union demands regarding wages, health care, and protections against sexual harassment. In July 2019, more than 300 union members signed a letter threatening to hold a strike authorization vote if negotiations did not make progress. In late October, after a two-week voting period, about 2500 graduate students voted to authorize the bargaining committee to call a strike, with 90.4% of votes cast favoring strike authorization.

HGSU-UAW went out on strike for the first time on December 3, 2019, citing (among other issues) the need for stronger protections against sexual harassment and discrimination, improved compensation, and more affordable and comprehensive healthcare (especially mental health and dental care). The strike ended on January 1, 2020.

See also
Student Researchers United-UAW - UC Berkeley student union affiliated with UAW

References

External links
 HGSU Website
 University Webpage on Unionization

Harvard University
Trade unions affiliated with the United Auto Workers
2015 establishments in Massachusetts
Trade unions established in 2015